The Agony in the Garden was an event in the life of Jesus.

Agony in the Garden may also refer to:

Paintings
 Agony in the Garden (anonymous), French, 1405–1408
 Agony in the Garden (Bellini), by Giovanni Bellini, c. 1459–1465
 Agony in the Garden (Blake), by William Blake, 1799–1800
 Agony in the Garden (Correggio), 1524
 Agony in the Garden (David), by Gerard David, c. 1510–1520
 Agony in the Garden (El Greco, Andújar), 1597–1607
 Agony in the Garden (El Greco, London), 1590
 Agony in the Garden (Mantegna, London), by Andrea Mantegna, 1458–1460
 Agony in the Garden (Mantegna, Tours), by Andrea Mantegna, 1457–1459
 Agony in the Garden (Perugino), by Pietro Perugino, c. 1483–1493
 Agony in the Garden, by Raphael from the predella of the altarpiece Madonna and Child Enthroned with Saints, c. 1503–1505
 Agony in the Garden, by Sheila Mackie, early 1960s

Other
 Agony in the Garden, two engravings by Albrecht Dürer, 1508 and 1515
 The Agony in the Garden, a copper relief by Angelo de Rossi, c. 1700
 The Agony in the Garden, a print by Master I. A. M. of Zwolle, late 1400s